In computing, UML eXchange Format (UXF) is a XML-based model interchange format for Unified Modeling Language (UML), which is a standard software modeling language. UXF is a structured format described in 1998 and intended to encode, publish, access and exchange UML models.

More recent alternatives include XML Metadata Interchange and OMG's Diagram Definition standard.

Known uses
 UMLet is an application that uses UXF as its native file format.

References

Unified Modeling Language